The Municipality of Kočevje is a municipality in southern Slovenia. The seat of the municipality is the city of Kočevje. Today it is part of the Southeast Slovenia Statistical Region. In terms of area, it is the largest municipality in Slovenia.

History
In 1247 Berthold, Patriarch of Aquileia granted the area around Ribnica within the imperial March of Carniola to the Carinthian counts of Ortenburg. When the counts received further estates on the wooded plateau down to Kostel on the Kolpa River in 1336 from the hands of Patriarch Bertram, they called for German-speaking settlers from Carinthia and Tyrol.  These Germanic people became known as the Gottscheers, and their dialect, Gottscheerish.

Thousands of Gottscheers, and others, were accused of sympathy for or collaboration with the Axis Powers during World War II (such as the Slovene Home Guard), after the war.  They, and typically their entire families, were summarily executed, thrown into various pits and caves, which were then sealed with explosives.

Settlements

In addition to the municipal seat of Kočevje, the municipality also includes the following settlements:

 Borovec pri Kočevski Reki
 Breg pri Kočevju
 Brezovica pri Predgradu
 Bukova Gora
 Čeplje
 Črni Potok pri Kočevju
 Cvišlerji
 Dol
 Dolga Vas
 Dolnja Briga
 Dolnje Ložine
 Gorenje
 Gornja Briga
 Gornje Ložine
 Gotenica
 Griček pri Željnah
 Hreljin
 Hrib pri Koprivniku
 Jelenja Vas
 Kačji Potok
 Kleč
 Klinja Vas
 Knežja Lipa
 Koblarji
 Kočarji
 Koče
 Kočevska Reka
 Komolec
 Konca Vas
 Koprivnik
 Kralji
 Kuhlarji
 Laze pri Oneku
 Laze pri Predgradu
 Livold
 Mačkovec
 Mahovnik
 Mala Gora
 Mlaka pri Kočevju
 Mlaka pri Kočevski Reki
 Mokri Potok
 Morava
 Mozelj
 Mrtvice
 Muha Vas
 Nemška Loka
 Nove Ložine
 Novi Lazi
 Ograja
 Onek
 Paka pri Predgradu
 Podjetniško Naselje Kočevje
 Podlesje
 Podstene
 Polom
 Predgrad
 Preža
 Primoži
 Pugled pri Starem Logu
 Rajhenav
 Rajndol
 Rogati Hrib
 Sadni Hrib
 Šalka Vas
 Seč
 Škrilj
 Slovenska Vas
 Smuka
 Spodnja Bilpa
 Spodnji Log
 Štalcerji
 Stara Cerkev
 Stari Breg
 Stari Log
 Staro Brezje
 Suhi Potok
 Svetli Potok
 Topla Reber
 Trnovec
 Vimolj pri Predgradu
 Vrbovec
 Vrt
 Zajčje Polje
 Zdihovo
 Željne

Flag 
The municipal flag of Kočevje is a tricolor consisting of three equal horizontal bands displaying the colors of Kočevje: blue and white, emblazoned with the coat of arms. The association with the colors blue and white dates to the 1470s, when Emperor Frederick III approved the design of the coat of arms, along with civic rights, on 19 April 1471. The flag during that time varies from the one seen today. The old flag was a bicolor of blue and white, defaced with the coat of arms, which was also different at the time.

Notable people
Notable people that were born or lived in the Municipality of Kočevje include:
 Matej Bor (1913–1993), poet and author
  (1923–1999), academy-trained painter, art teacher, art theorist
 Ivan Jurkovič (born 1952), apostolic nuncio to Russia
 Zofka Kveder (1878–1926), writer
  (1860–1923), longtime mayor
  (1858–1924), composer
 Roman Erich Petsche (1907–1993), teacher, painter, and Righteous Among the Nations
  (1908–1942), secondary-school professor, social revolutionary, communist resistance fighter
  (1898–?), geologist, taught at the secondary school before the Second World War

References

Bibliography

External links

 Municipality of Kočevje on Geopedia
 Website of the Municipality of Kočevje

Kocevje
1994 establishments in Slovenia